Cowan Lake may refer to:

Antarctica
Lake Cowan (Antarctica)

Canada 
Cowan Lake (Saskatchewan)

United States 
Cowan Lake (Georgia) reservoir in Rockdale County
Cowan Lake (Michigan) in Kent County
Cowan Lake (Minnesota) in Lake County
Cowan Lake (Carroll County, Missouri) reservoir and dam
Cowan Lake East reservoir and dam in Cedar County, Missouri
Cowan Lake West reservoir and dam in Cedar County, Missouri
Cowan Lake (Maries County, Missouri) reservoir and dam
Cowan Lake (New Mexico) in Otero County
Cowan Lake (Ohio) reservoir and dam in Clinton County
Cowans Gap Lake reservoir in Fulton County, Pennsylvania
Cowan Lake (Texas) reservoir and dam in Baylor County

Other 
Cowan Lake Sailing Association
Cowan Lake State Park